Bruno Simões Teixeira (born July 4, 1988 in Rio de Janeiro), or simply Simões, is a Brazilian central defender. He currently plays for Itaúna on loan from Cruzeiro.

Contract
Itaúna (Loan) 21 January 2008 to 31 May 2008
Cruzeiro 11 October 2006 to 30 September 2009

External links

 

1988 births
Living people
Brazilian footballers
Botafogo de Futebol e Regatas players
Cruzeiro Esporte Clube players
Esporte Clube Itaúna players
Association football defenders
Footballers from Rio de Janeiro (city)